Always Right As In We Are is Rory's 2004 One Eleven Records debut EP. The album was produced by Chris Fudurich.

Track listing
"Deja Vroom" - 3:57
"This Could Have Been A Dance Dance Revolution; But Now It's Just A Dance" - 3:30
"Conversations With Strangers (Little Secrets)" - 3:00
"Packed More Trunks Than The Jersey Mob" - 4:12
"The Sick Six Hundred" - 3:51

Rory (band) albums
2004 EPs